New Start, also known as UK, is a political party in Hungary founded by György Gémesi, mayor of Gödöllő. The party adheres to a centrist Third Way political philosophy.

History
The party was founded in 2017, although Gémesi had floated the formation of his own party on previous occasions. He announced the formation of the party on March 15, along with its 12-point platform.

In July of that year, Gémesi announced that he was negotiating cooperation with centrist party Politics Can Be Different (LMP). In December 2017, György Gémesi and Bernadett Szél has agreed, that the New Start and the Politics Can Be Different is running together in the 2018 Hungarian parliamentary election. During the election, György Gémesi was elected as MP but later resigned, and Krisztina Hohn replaced him on June 11. She joined the Politics Can Be Different group at the National Assembly.

In July 2018, György Gémesi announced that his party would no longer cooperate with the LMP for the next year's European Parliament and municipal elections.

At the European level, the party joined the European Democratic Party in February 2019.

Ideology
 Representing democratic values, promoting the enforcement of the rule of law.
 Increasing the well-being of Hungarian citizens and ensuring the sustainable development of the economy.
 Strengthen the unity of the Hungarian nation.
 Implementation of a policy that is conducive to recognizing our country as a respected member of the democracies.
 Provide favorable conditions for young people to learn, to work and to set up a family.
 Statements of MEPs in parliamentary, municipal and European Parliament elections.
 Give its members the opportunity to engage in public life.

Leadership
 President: György Gémesi
 Vice-president: Györgyi Ambrus
 Vice-president: Adrienn Pusztai-Csató
 Vice-president: Krisztina Hohn
 Vice-president: Róbert Molnár
 Chairman of the caucus: Gábor Üveges

See also 
 Politics of Hungary

References

External links

https://twitter.com/uj_kezdet

2017 establishments in Hungary
Anti-corruption parties
Centrist parties in Hungary
Conservative parties in Hungary
European Democratic Party
Liberal conservative parties
Liberal parties in Hungary
Neoliberal parties
Opposition to Viktor Orbán
Political parties established in 2017
Political parties in Hungary
Pro-European political parties in Hungary